Korea Military Academy (KMA) is the leading South Korean institution for the education and training of officer cadets for the Republic of Korea Army. Along with the Korea Army Academy (Yeongcheon), it produces the largest number of senior officers in the Korean army. Commonly referred to as Hwarangdae ( Hanja: 花郞臺)) as a reference to the Hwarang, an elite organization of youth leaders which existed in Korean history, it is located in Nowon-gu, a northeastern district of Seoul, South Korea.

History 
The academy was founded on May 1, 1946, as South Joseon Defense Academy by National Defense Command, the predecessor of Ministry of National Defense of Republic of Korea, under the authority of then-U.S. military administration in South Korea. With the end of the Pacific War and the subsequent disbandment of the Imperial Japanese Army, which had been occupying Korea since 1910, a void of indigenous security force was created, while the pool of human resource was composed of various backgrounds, including the former Imperial Japanese Army, Manchurian Army, and Korean Liberation Army. As a preparatory measure, the U.S. military administration opened the Military Language School in Seoul on December 5, 1945, in order to train military interpreters as well as the new generation of commissioned officers with unified, predominantly American military doctrine.

Following the establishment of the South Joseon National Defense Force, the predecessor of the Republic of Korea Army, in January 1946, the School closed down on April 30, and South Joseon Defense Academy was founded the next day, taking over 60 cadets from the school and augmented by 28 new officer candidates drafted from line units. Henceforth, May 1 has been recognized as the official foundation day of KMA. Cham-ryeong (current rank of major) Lee Hyung-geun was appointed as the first superintendent of the academy, and Bu-wi (current rank of first lieutenant) Jang Chang-kuk was appointed as the commandant. Following the establishment of the South Korean government on August 15, 1948, the National Defense Force was renamed to 'Republic of Korea Army', and so was South Joseon Defense Academy to 'Korea Military Academy' accordingly.

Campus 
 
The campus is located in Gongreung 2-dong, Nowon-gu, Seoul, Republic of Korea.

Dress uniform 
The Corps of Cadets KMA wear a dark blue full dress uniform with a shako on parades - a mix of the United States tradition infused in the early years combined with the Korean traditional uniform used by the army in the Imperial period. The hackle carried with the shako is gold.

See also 
 Republic of Korea military academies
 Korea Air Force Academy 
 Korea Naval Academy
 Korea Army Officer Candidate School
 List of national universities in South Korea
 List of universities and colleges in South Korea
 Education in Korea

References 

 History of KMA: https://web.archive.org/web/20041214232306/http://www.kma.ac.kr/open/kmaintroduction/sub2.html (Korean)
 KMA Motto: https://web.archive.org/web/20071230012349/http://www.kma.ac.kr/english/open/sub3.html (English)

External links 

 Korea Military Academy
Korea Military Academy

Republic of Korea Army
Military academies of South Korea
Universities and colleges in Seoul
Nowon District
Educational institutions established in 1946
1946 establishments in Korea